Leonese is a set of vernacular Romance language varieties currently spoken in northern and western portions of the historical region of León in Spain (the modern provinces of León, Zamora, and Salamanca) and a few adjoining areas in Portugal. In this narrow sense, Leonese is distinct from the dialects grouped under the Asturian language. There is no real linguistic division, though; it is only a purely political and identitary division, as dialectal areas (western, central, eastern...) are in fact shaped along a north-south axis (thus encompassing lands both north and south of the mountains, both in Asturias and in Castile and León). In the past, it was spoken in a wider area, including most of the historical region. The current number of Leonese speakers is estimated at 20,000 to 50,000. The westernmost fringes of the provinces of León and Zamora are in the territory of the Galician language, although there is dialectal continuity between the linguistic areas.

The Leonese and Asturian dialects have long been recognized as a single language, currently known as Astur-Leonese or Asturian-Leonese. Sometimes the language as a whole is simply called "Asturian" because of several reasons, such as the Leonese dialects being on the brink of extinction, or the widespread ignorance of its very existence (even in León), as well as their lack of recognition and institutional support (as opposed to their Asturian counterparts). On the other hand, Menéndez Pidal and fellow scholars discussed a "Leonese language" descending from Latin and encompassing two groups: the Asturian dialects on one hand, and dialects spoken in the provinces of León and Zamora in Spain and a related dialect in Trás-os-Montes (Portugal), on the other hand.

Unlike Asturian, which is regulated by the Academy of the Asturian Language (ALLA) and promoted by the Asturian Government and local legislation, the Leonese dialects are not officially promoted or regulated.

Moreover, the Asturleonese dialect (considered part of the Leonese dialects) of Miranda do Douro (Portugal), Mirandese, is most certainly a dialect on its own, considering the numerous differences it has when compared to dialects in the Spanish side. In fact, it is often considered as a separate language, especially in Portugal, where it is an official language along with Portuguese and it is regulated by the Institute of the Mirandese Language. Thus, Asturleonese is sometimes considered a group of two languages, Asturian or Asturleonese proper, and Mirandese.

Name 
Menéndez Pidal used "Leonese" for the entire linguistic area, including Asturias. This designation has been replaced by Ibero-Romance scholars with "Asturian-Leonese", but "Leonese" is still often used to denote Asturian-Leonese by non-speakers of Asturian or Mirandese.

Linguistic description

Phonology 
In Leonese, any of five vowel phonemes, may occur in stressed position.

Grammar 
Leonese has two genders (masculine and feminine) and two numbers (singular and plural).

Adjectives 
Adjectives agree with nouns in number and gender.

Comparative table

Historical, social and cultural aspects

History 

The native languages of Leon, Zamora, Asturias, and the Terra de Miranda in Portugal are the result of the evolution of Latin introduced by Roman conquerors in the region. Their colonization and organization led to the Conventus Asturum, with its capital at Asturica Augusta (present-day Astorga, Spain, the centre of Romanization for the indigenous tribes).

The city of Astorga was sacked by the Visigoths in the 5th century, and never regained its former prominence. The region remained unified until the eighth-century Islamic invasion. Around the 11th century, it began to be defined as Leonese territory roughly corresponding to the southern conventus. In medieval León, the Romance Galician, Asturian-Leonese, and Castilian  languages evolved and spread south.

The first known text in Asturian-Leonese is the Nodicia de kesos, written between 974 and 980 AD, an inventory of cheeses owned by a monastery written in the margin of the reverse of a document written in Latin. During the 12th and 13th centuries, Leonese reached its territorial zenith as the administrative language of the Kingdom of León, a literary language ( and the Libro de Alexandre), in the Leonese court, judiciary (with the translation of the Visigothic Liber Iudicum or Liber Iudiciorum into Leonese), administration, and organization.

After the 1230 union of Leon and Castile, Leonese had greater written and institutional use, although at the end of the 13th century Castilian began to replace it as a written language. Leonese became an oral, rural language with little literary development.

At the beginning of the 20th century, it survived in oral form only in mid-western León and western Zamora provinces. Its scientific study and a nascent cultural movement began in the province of Leon in 1906. During the 1950s and 60s, the number of Leonese speakers and the area in which it was spoken decreased.

Use and distribution 

Although the Astur-Leonese linguistic domain covers most of the principality of Asturias, the north and west of the province of Leon, the northeast of Zamora, both provinces in Castile and León, and the region of Miranda do Douro in the east of the Portuguese district of Bragança, this article focuses on the autonomous community of Castile and León.
Borrego Nieto wrote that the area in where Leonese is best preserved, defined as "area 1", consists of the regions of Babia and Laciana, part of Los Argüellos, eastern Bierzo and La Cabrera; in Zamora, non-Galician Sanabria.

Borrego Nieto describes another geographical circle, which he calls "area 2", where Leonese is fading: " ... It is extended to the regions between the interior area and the Ribera del Órbigo (Maragatería, Cepeda, Omaña ... ). In Zamora, the region of La Carballeda – with the subregion La Requejada – and Aliste, with at least a part of its adjacent lands ( and Tábara). This area is characterized by a blur and progressive disappearance, greater as we move to the East, of the features still clearly seen in the previous area. The gradual and negative character of this characteristic explains how vague the limits are".

Number of speakers 

A "speaker of Leonese" is defined here as a person who knows (and can speak) a variety of Leonese. There is no linguistic census of the number of Leonese speakers in the provinces of León and Zamora, and estimates vary from 5,000 to 50,000.

Studies 

Two sociolinguistic studies, in northern Leon and the entire province analysed the prevalence of Leonese and the linguistic attitudes of its speakers. According to the latter, maintenance of the language is the primary wish but opinions differ about how to do so. Almost 37 percent think that the language should be kept for nonofficial uses, and about 30 percent believe it should be on a par with Spanish. Twenty-two percent favour its disappearance. Nearly the population supports granting official status to Leonese by amending the Statute of Autonomy. About 70 percent favour linguistic coordination between León and Asturias, with 20 percent opposing. Leonese in education is favoured by more than 63 percent of the population, and opposed by about 34 percent. Institutional promotion of the dialect, especially by town councils, was favoured by more than 83 percent of respondents.

Recognition 
The Statute of Autonomy of Castile and León, amended 30 November 2007, addresses the status of Spanish, Leonese, and Galician. According to Section 5.2, "Leonese will be specifically protected by the institutions for its particular value within the linguistic patrimony of the Community. Its protection, usage and promotion will be regulated".

On 24 February 2010, a parliamentary group from the Spanish Socialist Workers' Party presented a proposition to the Cortes of Castile and León to recognize the value of Leonese and implement a plan to protect and promote it. Although the proposition was approved unanimously by the plenary session of the parliament of Castile and León on 26 May, the government's position has not changed.

Vitality 

UNESCO, in its Atlas of the World's Languages in Danger, listed Leonese in the most at-risk category. The category's criteria are:
 unofficial
 without legitimized significant use in the news media
 low levels of proficiency and use
 poor social prestige
 not used as a medium of primary education
 not used in official toponyms

Standardization 
The Autonomous Community of Castile and León lacks a government agency to promote minority languages and a nongovernmental agency in an advisory capacity in matters pertaining to minority languages. The Academy of the Asturian Language has sponsored linguistic and sociolinguistic research, which encompasses the non-Asturian dialects of Asturian-Leonese.
Two congresses about Leonese have been held, at which the following measures were proposed to move towards language standardization:
 Based on articles 5.2 and 5.3 of the Statute of Autonomy, raise the legal status of Leonese to equal that of Galician.
 Create an autonomous administrative organ under the Department of Culture and Tourism responsible for protecting and promoting Leonese and Galician.
 Introduce Leonese into adult and childhood education.
 Recover native toponymy with bilingual signage.
 Support cultural and literary Leonese and its publications and collaborate with associations which base their work on the recovery of Leonese, encourage Leonese in social media, and promote literary contests in the dialect.
 Promote study of Leonese through the universities and centres of study and investigation such as the Institute of Studies in Zamora, the Cultural Institute in Leon, the Institute of Studies of El Bierzo and the Marcelo Macías Institute of Studies in Astorga.
 Coordinate and cooperate with linguistic institutions, study centres, and administrations in the rest of the Asturialeonese linguistic area.
 Require local governments to assume responsibility for the recovery of Leonese.

Promotion 
For about 15 years cultural associations have offered Leonese-language courses, sometimes with the support of local administrations in the provinces of Leon and Zamora. In 2001, the Universidad de León (University of León) created a course for teachers of Leonese. The dialect can be studied in the larger villages of León, Zamora and Salamanca provinces as El Fueyu courses, following an agreement between the Leonese provincial government and the organization. The Leonese Language Teachers and Monitors Association (Asociación de Profesores y Monitores de Llingua Llïonesa) was created in 2008 to promote Leonese-language activities.

Literature 
Leonese literature includes:
 Benigno Suárez Ramos, El tío perruca, 1976. .
 Cayetano Álvarez Bardón, Cuentos en dialecto leonés, 1981. .
 Xuan Bello, Nel cuartu mariellu, 1982. .
 Miguel Rojo, Telva ya los osos, 1994. .
 Manuel García Menéndez, Corcuspin el Rozcayeiru, 1984. .
 Manuel García Menéndez, Delina nel valle'l Faloupu, 1985. .
 Eva González Fernández, Poesía completa : 1980–1991, 1991. .
 Cuentos de Lleón: Antoloxía d'escritores lleoneses de güei, 1996. .
 Roberto González-Quevedo, L.lume de l.luz, 2002. .
 Roberto González-Quevedo, Pol sendeiru la nueite, 2002. .
 Roberto González-Quevedo, Pan d'amore : antoloxía poética 1980–2003, 2004. .
 Roberto González-Quevedo, El Sil que baxaba de la nieve, 2007. .
 Emilce Núñez Álvarez, Atsegrías ya tristuras, 2005. .
 Luis Cortés Vázquez, Leyendas, cuentos y romances de Sanabria, 2003. .
 Ramón Menéndez Pidal, El dialecto leonés (Commemorative edition with stories and poems in Leonese), 2006. .
 Cuentos populares leoneses (escritos por niños), 2006. .
 Nicolás Bartolomé Pérez, Filandón: lliteratura popular llionesa, 2007. .
 José Aragón y Escacena, Entre brumas, 1921. .
 Francisco Javier Pozuelo Alegre, Poemas pa nun ser lleídos, 2008. .
 Xosepe Vega Rodríguez, Epífora y outros rellatos, 2008. .
 Xosepe Vega Rodríguez, Breve hestoria d'un gamusinu, 2008. .
 Antoine De Saint-Exupéry, El Prencipicu (Translation of The Little Prince), 2009. .
 Ramón Rei Rodríguez, El ñegru amor, 2009. .
 Juan Andrés Oria de Rueda Salguero, Llogas carbayesas, 2009. .

See also 

 Asturian language
 Mirandese language
 Spanish language
 Bercian dialect
 Asociación de Profesores y Monitores de Llingua Llïonesa
 Caitano Bardón
 Cuentos del Sil
 Eva González

References

Sources

Further reading 
 .
 
 
 
 Reprinted in:

External links 

 Official website of Asociación L'Alderique
 Leonese Council Official Website with information in Leonese
 Leonese Language Association
 Top Level Domain for Leonese
 Asociación de Profesores y Monitores de Llingua Llïonesa
 Llionpedia, an independent encyclopedia in Leonese

Languages attested from the 10th century
Endangered Romance languages
Kingdom of León
Leonese language